Oskar Merikanto (born Frans Oskar Ala-Kanto; 5 August 1868, Helsinki17 February 1924, Hausjärvi-Oitti) was a Finnish composer, music critic, pianist, and organist.

As a composer, Merikanto was primarily a miniaturist, and  includes songs and piano pieces (he wrote over 100 of each). Of the latter, he is best remembered for: Summer Evening Waltz (Op. 1), Romance (Op. 12), Summer Evening Idyll (Op. 16/2),  (Op. 33), and Idyll (Op. 73/1). Merikanto also wrote three operas: The Maiden of the North (1898), which retains a degree of historical significance as the first opera composed to a Finnish libretto; The Death of Elina (1910); and Regina von Emmeritz (1920). However, Merikanto's operas have entered neither the domestic nor the international repertoires.

As a music critic, Merikanto was associated with the Finnish-language, liberal, nationalist newspaper Päivälehti.

Biography
He was the son of Frans Ferdinand Ala-Kanto (his surname is also reported as Aittomäki; 1845–1891) from Jalasjärvi, Southern Ostrobothnia and Anna Helena Merikanto (1842–1885). Frans got a Swedish-language surname, Mattsson, when he joined the Finnish army. His father had changed the family name from Ala-Kanto to Merikanto in 1882. Meri means "sea" and refers to his voyage from Vaasa to Helsinki; Kanto refers to his origins from the estate Kanto.

He studied for some time at the Leipzig Conservatory in Germany, where his teachers were Carl Reinecke, Theodor Coccius, Robert Papperitz, Willy Rechenberg and Gustav Schreck.

He was notable for his variety of talents – he gave concerts all around Finland, performing on the piano and organ, conducting orchestras, and composing original music. Some of his most beloved compositions are Där björkarna susa, the waltz Kesäilta (Summer Evening Waltz) and the Valse lente Op. 33.

Merikanto's style is reminiscent of Finnish folk songs, but has its basis in Italian bel canto.

He died in Hausjärvi-Oitti.

Personal life
He married Elise "Liisa" Häyrynen (1869–1949) in 1892. They had one son, Aarre Merikanto, a noted Finnish composer.

Works 
Piano

 Concert-Walzer OM 018
 Erinnerung OM 036
 Fantasia (Tuoll’ on mun kultani) OM 037 (piano four hands)
 Fest-Marsch OM 040
 Grande valse OM 044
 Hiljaa illan hämärässä (additional two Solo Voices)
 Hopeahääpäivän valjetessa OM 055
 Jesu, elon autuuteni I OM 071
 Jesu, elon autuuteni II Om 071
 Kaanon As-Duuri OM 081
 Kaanon B-Duuri (Canon in Oberquarte) OM 082
 Kaanon E-Duuri (Canon in Unterquinte) OM 084
 Kaanon Es-Duuri (Canon in Unterterz) OM 085
 Kaanon Es-duuri OM 086
 Kaanon Es-duuri OM 087
 Kaanon F-duuri OM 088
 Kaanon G-duuri OM 089
 Kaanon G-duuri OM 090
 Kaipaus OM 092
 Kangasalan tunnelmaa OM 095
 Karjalan jääkärien marssi OM 101
 Kirkkoaikana OM 114 (piano four hands)
 Kolja-vals OM 117
 Liebestraum OM 148
 Lied ohne Worte OM 149
 Maa, suuri ja avara I OM 156
 Maa, suuri ja avara II OM 156
 Me sinua, Jesu, ylistämme OM 159
 Molto Allegro Scherzando OM 174
 Parolan marssi OM 202
 Phantasiestück OM 204
 Pianokappale OM 205
 Porilaisten marssi OM 208
 Porin rykmentin marssi OM 209
 Rakas muisto
 Ruusu OM 226
 Scherzo
 Scherzo G-Duuri
 Serenade OM 233
 Syntymäpäivämarssi OM 262
 Syntymäpäiväpoloneesi OM 263
 Taivaasta ilosanoman OM 268
 Tapanien tanssi OM 272
 Tempo di Polonaise OM 274
 Toivo OM 277
 Trauermarsch OM 279
 Träumerei I OM 280
 Träumerei II OM 280
 Ukko Noak OM 293
 Valkoisen kaartin marssi OM 300
 Valse lente Op. 33

 Yksinään
 Yli Atlantin Op. 28
 Romanssi, Op. 12
 Pohjan neiti (Maiden of the North) (1898)
 Nälkämaan laulu (The Song of the Hungry) (1911)

Organ

 Choral mit Vorspiel und Zwischenspiel I OM 190
 Choral mit Vorspiel und Zwischenspiel II OM 190
 Choral mit Vorspiel und Zwischenspiel III OM 190
 Der doppelte Contrapunkt OM 019
 Fantasia cromatica OM 038
 Fantasia ja koraali OM 039
 Häähymni [Wedding Hymn] OM 057
 Iltalaulu [Abendlied] (arr.)
 Konserttifantasia OM 120
 Passacaglia Op. 80
 Postludium I Op. 88 No 1
 Postludium II Op. 88 No 2
 Postludium III Op. 88 No 3
 Prelude A minor (arr.) (BWV 807)
 Prelude G minor (arr.) (BWV 808)
 Rukous OM 222
 Sarabande D minor (arr.) (BWV 812)
 Sarabande E minor (arr.) (BWV 810)
 Prelude and Fuge B minor (BWV 891) (arr.)

Solo Voice

 Pai, pai, paitaressu Op. 2 No 1
 Vanha mummo Op. 2 No 2
 Onneton Op. 2 No 3
 Die Sprache des Waldes [Metsän mieli] Op. 7 No 1
 Stille Sicherheit [Äänettömässä rauhassa] Op. 7 No 2
 Scheideblick Op. 7 No 3
 Ewige Treue Op. 7 No 4 
 Kevätlinnuille etelässä Op. 11 No 1 
 Muistellessa Op. 11 No 2
 Yöllä Op. 11 No 3a
 Se rakkaus Op. 13 No 4 
 Tuulan tei Op. 13 No 5 
 Hennan keinulaulu Op. 14 No 2
 Reppurin laulu Op. 14 No 10
 Kun saapuu Herra Zebaoth Op. 17
 Hyljätty Op. 18 No 1
 Ilta tuntureilla Op. 18 No 2
 Haave Op. 18 No 3a
 Immen pelko Op. 18 No 4
 Se kolmas Op. 19b
 Kullan murunen Op. 20 No 1
 Miksi laulan Op. 20 No 2
 Vertaus Op. 20 No 3a
 Kun päivä paistaa Op. 24 No 1
 Vallinkorvan laulu Op. 24 No 2
 Laulan lasta nukkumahan Op. 30 No 1
 Laula tyttö! Op. 30 No 2
 Tule! Op. 30 No 3
 Myrskylintu Op. 30 No 4
 Mä lykkään purteni laineillen Op. 32 No 1
 Kas, oksa värähtää Op. 32 No 2
 Hän kulkevi kuin yli kukkien Op. 32 No 3
 Kylän tiellä Op. 32 No 4
 Nyt ja sitten [Jetzt und einst] Op. 34 No 1
 Vallflickan [Das Hirtenmädchen] Op. 34 No 2
 Kyynel [Die Träne] Op. 34 No 3
 Ainut hetki Op. 36 No 1
 Kottarainen Op. 36 No 2
 Soi vienosti murheeni soitto Op. 36 No 3
 An den Frühling Op. 38 No 1
 Ström' leise Op. 38 No 2
 Wehmut Op. 38 No 3
 Takt Op. 38 No 4
 Ilmattaren laulu Op. 40 No 1
 Rukous (Ave Maria) Op. 40 No 2
 Töne der Waldtauben [Metsäkyyhkyset] Op. 47 No 1
 Kuin hiipuva hiillos tummentuu Op. 47 No 2
 Aftonstämning Op. 47 No 3 
 Merellä Op. 47 No 4a
 Merellä Op. 47 No 4b
 Tuonen tytön laulu Op. 48 No 1
 Tuuti lulla mun kuopustain Op. 48 No 2
 Kun vaan laulaa saan Op. 49 No 1
 Kuolema kannelta löi Op. 49 No 2
 Jos olet mun! Op. 49 No 3
 Vackra flicka, gift dig snart [Etsi sulho, neitonen] Op. 51 No 1
 Annina Op. 51 No 2
 De gledo på kanalen [Kuun koittaessa] Op. 51 No 3
 Taas soivat ne suuret surut Op. 52 No 1
 Linnulle kirkkomaalla Op. 52 No 2
 Oi, muistatko vielä sen virren Op. 52 No 3
 Itkevä huilu Op. 52 No 4
 Omenankukat Op. 53 No 1
 Oi, minne emon lintunen lensi? Op. 53 No 2
 Kun nukahdan katsoen tähtiin ma Op. 54
 Illan kuutamossa Op. 58 No 1
 Lapselle Op. 58 No 2
 Yksin Op. 58 No 3
 Kevätlaulu Op. 58 No 4
 Elämän laulu Op. 61
 Tuuti, mun vauvani, nukkukaa! Op. 67 No 1
 Tipu, tipu, kuuleppas! Op. 67 No 2
 Paimentyttö Op. 67 No 3
 Matka maailman loppuun Op. 67 No 4
 Ilialin laulu Op. 69 No 1
 Illansuussa Op. 69 No 2 
 Nuoruuden ylistys Op. 69 No 3
 Balladi Op. 69 No 4
 Ma elän! Op. 71 No 1
 Talvikukkia Op. 71 No 2
 Valkeat ristit Op. 74 No 1
 Laulaja taivaan portilla Op. 74 No 2
 Käy kirkkomaata illoin vanhat mummot Op. 74 No 3
 Päivännousu kultaa kirkkomaan Op. 74 No 4
 Hyvää yötä Op. 75 No 1
 Lauantai-ilta Op. 75 No 2
 Tule kanssani Op. 75 No 3
 Laula, laula, lapsonen Op. 78 No 1
 Mä haaveksin näin Op. 78 No 2
 Surun voima Op. 78 No 3
 Sinulle Op. 81 No 1
 Rote Blumen [Punakukat] Op. 81 No 2
 Niin sinua katsoin, neiti Op. 81 No 3
 Gamla Maja Op. 81 No 4
 Yö Op. 82 No 1
 Aamulaulu Op. 82 No 2
 Lastentaru takkavalkealla Op. 82 No 3
 Enten - Eller Op. 82 No 4
 Laatokka Op. 83 No 1
 Tule tuskaani yö Op. 83 No 2
 Päivä Op. 83 No 3
 Vi ses igen! Op. 83 No 4
 Teitä siunaan Op. 84 No 1
 Vågorna vagga min hvita båt [Aaltoset tuutivat venhoain] Op. 84 No 2
 Öiset tiuvut Op. 87 No 1
 Suvi-illan vieno tuuli Op. 87 No 2
 Hyvästi! Op. 87 No 3
 Kansanlaulu Op. 90 No 1
 En skymningsvisa Op. 90 No 2
 Suvi-ilta Op. 91 No 1
 Sommarmorgon i skogen Op. 91 No 2
 Visa i väntan Op. 91 No 3
 Kasakan kehtolaulu Op. 91 No 4
 Agneta Op. 93 No 1
 Genezaretin rannalla Op. 93 No 2
 Bedövning [Raukeus] Op. 93 No 3
 Elämälle Op. 93 No 4
 Hämärissä Op. 96 No 1
 Vågen Op. 96 No 2
 Min älskade Op. 96 No 3
 Äitini silmät Op. 99
 Polska Op. 103 No 1
 Fågelungarna flögo ur bo Op. 103 No 2
 Bacchanal Op. 105 No 1
 Mot segern Op. 105 No 2
 Allting glider mot döden [Kaikki liukuu kohti kuolemaa] Op. 105 No 3
 Iltakellot Op. 106 No 1
 Sinipiiat Op. 106 No 2
 Minä laulan sun iltasi tähtihin Op. 106 No 3
 Laulelen pojalleni pikkuiselle Op. 107 No 1
 Maid, wo ist deiner Augen Glanz Op. 107 No 2
 Ainoa maan päällä Op. 107 No 3 
 Frisch gesungen! Op. 108 No 1
 Mutter Op. 108 No 2
 Hab' Sonne! Op. 108 No 3
 Beherzigung [Kun sulle taakaks' elo käy] Op. 109 No 1
 Käsittämätön Jumala Op. 109 No 2
 Kummaa on mielestäin Op. 109 No 3
 Yö Op. 110 No 1
 Syyslaulu Op. 110 No 2
 Mummo Op. 110 No 3
 Aurinko laski Op. 113 No 1
 Mistä — mihin? Op. 113 No 2
 Huolissaan huokaileva OM 056
 Ihmis-elo OM 061
 Im Waldgeheg’ OM 063
 Kiitävi aatos kaipuun siivin OM 112
 Kom! OM 118
 Koskenlaskijan laulu OM 121
 Kotiranta OM 122
 Lemmen laulu OM 145
 Liebesfeier OM 147
 Maammopa valvoi marjuttansa OM 157
 Marjatan kehtolaulu OM 158
 Nocturne OM 180
 O pauvre mère malheureuse OM 188
 Oh Phantasie, du süßes Träumen! OM 189
 Romanssi ilman sanoja OM 221 (Voice and Lute)
 Släktvisan OM 240
 Vad fattas mig än? OM 298
 Viihdy täällä impi kukka OM 313
 Voi äiti parka ja raukka OM 319

Sheet music 

 Piano Pieces 1: Suomalaisia Kansanlauluja 1. Vihko
 Piano Pieces 4: Suomalaisia Kansanlauluja 4. Vihko
 Piano Pieces 5: Suomalaisia Kansanlauluja 5. Vihko

See also
 Golden Age of Finnish Art

References

External links
 Collected Solo Songs published by Edition Tilli Ltd.
 
 Streaming audio at the Gustavus Adolphus College Archives
 Zigenaren
 Lauluja – Tukkijoella ; Vallinkorvan laulu (Vallinkorva's song)
 Dar björkarna susa (Where the birches sway)
 Säg, minnes du psalmen vi sjöngo
 Itkevä huilu ; Soi vienosti murheeni soitto
 http://www.geni.com/people/Frans-Ferdinand-Ala-Kanto/6000000019222896516
 Video of Aura Go playing three piano pieces op.20 at her website

1868 births
1924 deaths
Musicians from Helsinki
People from Uusimaa Province (Grand Duchy of Finland)
Finnish classical composers
Romantic composers
Finnish classical pianists
Finnish organists
Male organists
Finnish conductors (music)
University of Music and Theatre Leipzig alumni
Finnish male classical composers
19th-century classical pianists
Burials at Hietaniemi Cemetery
Male classical pianists
20th-century conductors (music)
20th-century male musicians
19th-century male musicians
20th-century Finnish composers